The men's 20 kilometres walk event at the 1963 Pan American Games was held at the Pacaembu Stadium in São Paulo on 3 May. It was the first time since 1951 that any racewalking event was contested at the Games.

Results

References

Athletics at the 1963 Pan American Games
1963